"Softly and Tenderly" is a Christian hymn. It was composed and written by Will L. Thompson in 1880.

Allegedly, when evangelist Dwight L. Moody was in the hospital barred from seeing visitors although Thompson had arrived, Moody insisted that Thompson be let in, whereupon Moody told him:
Will, I would rather have written "Softly and Tenderly Jesus Is Calling" than anything I have been able to do in my whole life.

Thompson was a member of the Churches of Christ, where several of his hymns and gospel songs continue in use. "Softly and Tenderly" is the most widely known of his compositions and has circulated far beyond its origins in the American Restoration Movement. It is among the most prolifically translated gospel songs and has spread appealingly into the repertoire of various fellowships of Christendom.

Selected recordings
 The Andrews Sisters - recorded on February 2, 1950 for Decca Records.

 The Million Dollar Quartet recorded the song in 1956.
 Pat Boone - included in his album Hymns We Love (1957).
 Rosemary Clooney - for her album Hymns from the Heart (1958).
 Daniel Johnston - for his album 1990 (1990)
The Martins - in their CD album An A Cappella Hymn Collection (1997)
 Amy Grant recorded a version of the song which appears on her 2002 studio album Legacy... Hymns and Faith, and later on her 2015 compilation album Be Still and Know... Hymns & Faith.
 Reba McEntire, Trisha Yearwood, and Kelly Clarkson recorded the song for Reba's Sing It Now: Songs of Faith & Hope (2017) +
Carrie Underwood recorded the song for her album of Gospel covers, My Savior (2021).

Use in modern culture

The song was featured in the film Urban Cowboy at Bud's (John Travolta's character) uncle's funeral.

The film The Trip to Bountiful makes recurrent use of the song, particularly a recording of it by Cynthia Clawson.

An a cappella version is sung by Alessandro Nivola in the film Junebug.

The song's melody appears twice in the movie Abrupt Decision, released 2011.

In November 2017, Carrie Underwood performed the hymn as part of the In Memoriam segment, which culminated in a tribute to the fifty-eight Route 91 shooting victims, at the 51st annual CMA Awards.

Performed at the funeral of Adele Stackhouse (Sookie's Granny), in True Blood.

References 

American Christian hymns
1880 songs